William Ernest Leigh (190720 November 1972) was an English professional snooker and English billiards player.

Biography
William Ernest Leigh was born in Derby in 1907. His father was the licensee of the Station Hotel, Derby. He won the 1923 under-16s British Junior English Billiards Championship, defeating Frank Edwards 600–482 in the final. By 1927, having received coaching from Joe Davis and others, Leigh had turned professional.

In 1933 he entered the World Professional Snooker Championship for the first time, taking a 4–0 lead against fellow debutant Walter Donaldson before Donaldson levelled the match at 4–4. The players were also tied at 8–8 and 10–10 before Donaldson won 13–11. Leigh did not enter the championship again before it was suspended from 1940 to 1945 due to World War II.
He served for five years in the Royal Air Force. His second world championship entry was in 1946 World Championship. Later that month, Leigh was defeated 6,782–8,972 by John Barrie in the UK Professional English Billiards Championship.

He entered the World Snooker Championship twice more, winning two qualifying matches each time. In 1947 he eliminated Herbert Francis 19–16 and Sydney Lee 25–10 before losing 14–21 to Kingsley Kennerley. At the 1948 championship he defeated Herbert Holt in the deciding frame, 18–17, and then, having trailed Barrie 5–9, won 14 of the next 16 and progressed with a 21–14 win.

Leigh, one of whose brothers was footballer Syd Leigh, became a resident professional at a billiard hall in Nottingham, and provided coaching. He died on 20 November 1972, aged 65.

References

English snooker players
English players of English billiards
1907 births
1972 deaths
Sportspeople from Derby